The 2018 United States Senate election in Maryland took place on November 6, 2018, in order to elect a member of the United States Senate to represent the State of Maryland. It was held concurrently with other elections to the United States Senate, elections to the United States House of Representatives, and various state and local elections. Incumbent Democratic U.S. Senator Ben Cardin was re-elected to a third term by a landslide margin of almost 35 points.

The primary election for the Senate race was held on June 26, 2018.

The incumbent, Ben Cardin, won the Democratic Party primary. In the general election, Cardin was reelected to a third term. Tony Campbell, a professor of political science at Towson University and former Army Chaplain, won the Republican Party primary. If elected, Campbell would have become Maryland's first African-American U.S. Senator. Businessman Neal Simon ran as an independent and Arvin Vohra was the Libertarian Party nominee in the general election. There were also several official write-in candidates.

Democratic primary

Candidates

Declared 
Ben Cardin, incumbent U.S. Senator
Erik Jetmir
Chelsea Manning, whistleblower, convicted of Espionage Act crimes, former U.S. Army soldier
 Marcia H. Morgan, of Montgomery County
 Jerome Segal, political activist and philosopher
 Richard "Rikki" Vaughn, of Baltimore
 Debbie "Rica" Wilson, candidate for MD-05 in 2016, of White Plains
 Lih Young, perennial candidate, of Montgomery County

Declined
 John Delaney, U.S. Representative (running for President in 2020)
 Donna Edwards, former U.S. Representative and candidate for the U.S. Senate in 2016 (running for Prince George's County Executive)
 Elijah Cummings, U.S. Representative
 Heather Mizeur, former state delegate
 John Sarbanes, U.S. Representative

Endorsements

Polling

Results

Republican primary

Candidates

Declared
 Tony Campbell, of Baltimore County, political science faculty member at Towson University
 Chris Chaffee, candidate for the U.S. Senate in 2016
 Evan M. Cronhardt, of Anne Arundel County
 Nnabu Eze, of Baltimore County, Green nominee for MD-03 in 2016
 John Graziani, candidate for the U.S. Senate in 2016 and candidate for MD-04 in 2014
 Christina J. Grigorian, attorney
 Albert Howard
 Bill Krehnbrink, perennial candidate
 Gerald I. Smith, Jr., conspiracy theorist, of Cecil County
 Blaine Taylor, perennial candidate, of Baltimore County
 Brian Charles Vaeth, perennial candidate

Withdrew
 Sam Faddis, former CIA officer and candidate for MD-05 in 2016

Declined
 Larry Hogan, Governor of Maryland since 2015 (running for reelection)

Endorsements

Results

Libertarian Party

Candidates

Declared
 Arvin Vohra, vice-chair of the Libertarian National Committee and perennial candidate, of Montgomery County

Independents

Candidates

Declared
 Michael B Puskar, property manager
 Edward Shlikas, home care compliance manager
 Neal Simon, businessman

General election

Candidates
 Ben Cardin, Incumbent (D)
 Tony Campbell, Professor at Towson University (R)
 Arvin Vohra, vice-chair of the Libertarian National Committee (L)
 Neal Simon, businessman (I)
 Michael B Puskar, property manager (I)

Endorsements

Debates 
On October 7, 2018, Cardin, independent candidate Neal Simon, and Republican candidate Tony Campbell participated in the sole televised debate of the campaign.

Predictions

Polling

Results

Results by county

Counties that flipped from Democrat to Republican
Frederick
Talbot

Counties that flipped from Republican to Democrat
Calvert
Somerset

See also
2018 United States Senate elections
2018 United States elections

References

Notes

External links
Candidates at Vote Smart 
Candidates at Ballotpedia 
Campaign finance at FEC 
Campaign finance at OpenSecrets

Official campaign websites
 Tony Campbell (R) for U.S. Senate
 Ben Cardin (D) for U.S. Senate
 Neal Simon (I) for U.S. Senate
 Arvin Vohra (L) for U.S. Senate 
 Michael B. Puskar (I) for U.S. Senate

2018
Maryland
United States Senate